Agios Nikolaos, also known as Aghios Nikolaos on signage, is on Athens Metro Line 1.

References

Athens Metro stations
Railway stations opened in 1956
1956 establishments in Greece